Fikadu or Fekadu is a surname of Ethiopian origin. Notable people with the surname include:

Abebe Fekadu (born 1970), Ethiopian-Australian Paralympic weightlifter
Belaynesh Fikadu (born 1987), Ethiopian long-distance runner
Habtamu Fikadu (born 1988), Ethiopian long-distance runner

Amharic-language names